Juan Ginés de Sepúlveda (11 June 1494 – 17 November 1573) was a Spanish humanist, philosopher, and theologian of the Spanish Renaissance.

Biography 

In 1533 and 1534 Sepúlveda wrote to Desiderius Erasmus from Rome concerning differences between Erasmus's Greek New Testament and the Codex Vaticanus. He was the adversary of Bartolomé de las Casas in the Valladolid Controversy in 1550 concerning the justification of the Spanish Conquest of the Indies. Sepúlveda was the defender of the Spanish Empire's right of conquest, of colonization, and of forced conversion in the so-called New World. He argued on the base of natural law philosophy and developed a position which was different from the position of the School of Salamanca, as represented famously by Francisco de Vitoria.

Sepúlveda translated several of Aristotle's works into Latin (e.g.  Parva naturalia 1522, Politics or De re publica 1548).

Spanish colonization of the Americas
The Valladolid Debate was organized by King Charles V to give an answer to the question whether the indigenous peoples of the Americas were capable of self-governance, during the Spanish colonization of the Americas.

Sepúlveda defended the position of the colonists, although he had never been to America, claiming that some Amerindians were "natural slaves" as defined by Aristotle in Book I of Politics. "Those whose condition is such that their function is the use of their bodies and nothing better can be expected of them, those, I say, are slaves of nature. It is better for them to be ruled thus." He said these natives are "as children to parents, as women are to men, as cruel people are from mild people". These assertions in regard to some but not all Amerindians were made in Democrates alter de justis belli causis apud Indos (A Second Democrates: on the just causes of war with Indians) Rome, 1550.  Although Aristotle was a primary source for Sepúlveda's argument, he also pulled from various Christian and other classical sources, including the Bible.

Las Casas utilized the same sources in his counterargument. According to Bartolomé de las Casas, God had power over all people in the world, including those who had never heard of Christianity. However, he thought that Christianity should be presented to natives as a religious option, not an obligation as Sepulveda believed. Las Casas said that Amerindians ought to enjoy the same freedoms as any other people because, in his view, no Amerindians lacked the ability to rule themselves.

Works 

 
 Gonsalus sive de appetenda gloria, 1523.
 De fato et libero arbitrio, Roma, 1526.
 Cohortatio ut bellum suscipiat in Turcas, 1529.
 De ritu nuptiarum et dispensatione, Roma, 1531.
 De convenientia militaris disciplinae cum christiana religione qui inscribitur Democrates, Roma, 1535.
 Alexandri Aphrodisiei Commentaria in dvodecim Aristotelis libros De prima philosophia, interprete Ioanne Genesio Sepulveda, Parisiis, Dimon de Colines, 1536.
 De rebus gestis Caroli V
 De rebus gestis Philippi II
 Democrates secundus sive de iustis belli causis ..., 1544.
Apologia pro libro de justis belli causis, 1550.
Epistolarum libri septem, 1557.
 
De regno libri III, 1570.
 
 Democrates alter, 1892.

See also 
 
 Indian reductions

Slavery among the indigenous peoples of the Americas
Black legend (Spain) — anti-Spanish Empire movement.
 School of Salamanca
 School of Salamanca & Just War theory
 Valladolid debate (1550–1551) — about the rights/non-rights and treatment of colonized peoples by colonizers.

Notes

Bibliography

 Nájera, Luna. ""Myth and Prophecy in Juan Ginés de Sepúlveda’s Crusading "Exhortación", in Bulletin for Spanish and Portuguese Historical Studies, 35:1 (2011). Discusses Sepúlveda's theories of war in relation to the war against the Ottoman Turks.
Nájera, Luna. “Masculinity, War, and Pursuit of Glory in Sepúlveda’s Gonzalo,” in Hispanic Review, Vol. 80.3, 2012. Outlines Sepúlveda's argument that the virtues prized by the military profession, such as fortitude, magnanimity, and the appetite for glory, are compatible with and even inherent in Christian doctrine. Examines underlying implications of that argument from a gender studies perspective.

External links 
 
 

Spanish Renaissance humanists
1480s births
1573 deaths
Spanish philosophers
Catholic philosophers
16th-century Spanish Roman Catholic theologians
Spanish Renaissance people
Greek–Latin translators
16th-century Latin-language writers